The Apo sunbird (Aethopyga boltoni) is a species of bird in the sunbird family Nectariniidae. It is endemic to the island of Mindanao in the Philippines.

Description 
The Apo sunbird has several distinctions between its male and female counterparts. Although they both have a long, curved bill, olive-colored back and wings, white-tipped tails, and a yellow underbelly, you can tell the difference due to the coloration of the throat. The male has a slim, faded, yellow stripe from its bill to its chest. Along with a dark gray outline around it, and a small red patch in front of its shoulder. The female sunbird has a pale gray throat.

Habitat and Distribution 
The Apo sunbird is a bird local to the island of Mindanao in the Philippines. It can be found in mountainous areas in the western and central parts of the island, specifically, Mount Apo, Mount Kitanglad, and Mount Malindang.  The Apo sunbird occurs at similar densities to its kin, the lovely sunbird at 49.1 individuals/km2. 10% of the mapped area is occupied, which places the number of individuals at 37,000. This would be equal to about 25,000 mature individuals. However, the Apo sunbird is thought to live at slightly lower densities than its counterparts, so it is believed 25,000 mature individuals live in the mountainous region of Mindanao.

Ecology 
The song can be a rapid, rising, and high-pitched trill of 15 notes. An alternative song may be equally rapid, even-pitched, and decelerating trill, or a continuous clip-clip-clip or sip-sip-sip.

Diet 
Although there is nothing definitive on their diet, we can presume based on other sunbird species that they feed primarily on nectar but will also consume insects and spiders when feeding their young.  They have various foraging patterns including singly, in pairs, and in mixed-species flocks.

Reproduction 
The Apo sunbird has been recorded breeding in January-July, with generation lengths averaging 2.4 years (ICU Redlist). Of the 2 nests ever found, one in 1904 and one in 1995, the second was found at over 2,400 meters. A female with an enlarged ovary was also found there in March. The nests were suspended high in the air, roughly 24 meters. The dimensions of the nest were 8 x 16 cm, with a side entrance of 3 cm, and were constructed of moss, spider eggs, and insect cases.

Taxonomy

The Apo sunbird was formally described in 1905 by the American ornithologist Edgar Alexander Mearns from specimens collected from Mount Apo on the island of Mindanao, Philippines. He coined the binomial name Aethopyga boltoni.

Three subspecies are recognised:
 A. b. malindangensis Rand & Rabor, 1957 – west Mindanao
 A. b. boltoni Mearns, 1905 – east-central, east Mindanao
 A. b. tibolii Kennedy, RS, Gonzales & Miranda, 1997 – south Mindanao

References

Apo sunbird
Birds of Mindanao
Apo sunbird
Taxonomy articles created by Polbot